Ravi Philips was a Sri Lankan cricketer. He was a right-arm bowler who played for Kalutara Town Club.

Philips made a single first-class appearance for the side during the 1996–97 season, against Burgher Recreation Club. From the lower order, he scored 8 runs in the first innings in which he batted, and 6 runs in the second.

Philips bowled 8 overs in the match, conceding 30 runs.

External links
Ravi Philips at CricketArchive 

Sri Lankan cricketers
Kalutara Town Club cricketers
Living people
Year of birth missing (living people)